Tonnay-Boutonne is a commune in the Charente-Maritime department in the Nouvelle-Aquitaine region in southwestern France.

Geography
The village lies on the right bank of the Boutonne, which flows southwest through the southern part of the commune.

Population

Sights
The door of Saint-Pierre

See also
Communes of the Charente-Maritime department

References

Communes of Charente-Maritime
County of Saintonge